Frankites is an extinct genus of cephalopods from the Triassic period  included in the Trachyceratidae, a family of mostly evolute ammonites, coiled so as all whorls are showing, and commonly ornamented with flexious, tuberculate ribs. Related genera include Anolcites, Daxatina, and Trachyceras.

Frankites has been found in Nevada, British Columbia, China, India, and Italy with a variety of other ceratitid ammonites.

References
Frankites -Paleobio

Trachyceratidae
Ceratitida genera
Triassic ammonites
Fossils of British Columbia
Fossils of Italy